The Denay Limestone is a geologic formation in Nevada. It preserves fossils dating back to the Devonian period. It is located in the Denay Valley, which lies between the Simpson Park Mountains and the Roberts Mountains.

See also

 List of fossiliferous stratigraphic units in Nevada
 Paleontology in Nevada

References

Devonian geology of Nevada